Pilferage or pilfering is the act of stealing items of low value, especially in small quantities, also called petty theft.

Pilferage may also refer to:
 Package pilferage, the theft of part of the contents of a package
 Pilferage (animal behavior), when one animal takes food from another animal's larder

See also
 Theft